Oui Can Luv is a studio album by Andy Allo featuring Prince on guitar, containing nine acoustic tracks, mostly covers. To date, the album has only been available for 12 hours on November 9, 2015, on the music streaming service Tidal, with whom Prince had an extensive partnership.

Track listing 
 "Fast Car" – 4:10
 "Push and Pull" – 3:31
 "Love Is a Losing Game" – 3:06
 "False Alarm" – 2:49
 "Wild World" – 2:28
 "I Love U in Me" – 4:19
 "Waiting in Vain" – 3:09
 "Oui Can Luv" – 4:20
 "More than This" – 2:59

References 

2015 albums
Albums produced by Prince (musician)
NPG Records albums